David Micevski (born 25 February 1986) is an Australian footballer who has played for Stirling Lions.

Club career
He was identified by former Perth Glory technical manager, Mich d'Avray as one of the brightest young prospects in the WA State League. He played an instrumental part of Perth Soccer Club's victorious league and cup double winning team in 2005.

The attack-minded midfielder signed on loan to Perth Glory for the tail end of the 2005/2006 A-League season, mainly due to injuries to the club's first team players. The club signed him on a full term contract before the start of the 2006/2007 season and his performances for the club has led to his call up to the Olyroos Australian national under 23 side. After parting ways with Perth Glory he signed for the Western Knights and was the WA State League player of the year for the 2009 season, and helped Western Knights to consecutive premierships and a cup winners medal during his time at the club.

He then spent a season in the Indonesian Premier Liga playing for Solo FC where he quickly became a fan favourite with the locals. Myanmar champions Yangon United then showed interest in the midfielder and he signed with the club on the back end of the 2011–2012 season.

Since playing back in Western Australia in the National Premier League, the midfielder won the Golden boot award in 2014 after scoring 16 goals in as many games from his midfield role.

In 2016 while playing for Stirling Lions in the National Premier League, Micevski became the first player in Western Australia to be awarded the McInerney Ford Gold Medal for the league's best & fairest for the second time after accumulating a record 38 votes with 9 man of the match performances throughout the regular season. He also netted 17 goals in the regular season and won the goal of the season.

International career
He played for Australia Under 23 National Team "Olyroos" from 2006 to 2008, He was capped at International level for the Olyroos and was part of the Australian qualifiers for the 2008 Beijing Olympic games.

References

1986 births
Living people
Australian soccer players
Perth Glory FC players
Expatriate footballers in Indonesia
A-League Men players
Association football midfielders
Stirling Macedonia FC players
Perth SC players
Western Knights SC players
Inglewood United FC players